Dharkenley District is a district in the southeastern Banaadir region of Somalia. It includes the westernmost neighborhoods of the national capital, Mogadishu.

See also
Madiina

References

Degmooyinka Soomaaliya
Administrative map of Dharkenley District

Districts of Somalia
Banaadir